Jurij Koch (born 15 September 1936) is a German writer. He writes in both Sorbian languages as well as German.

Koch's father worked in the nearby quarry, his mother worked several jobs at different farms. Jurij Koch went to school in Crostwitz, northern Czechoslovakia, Bautzen and Cottbus, and studied at the University of Leipzig.

He has worked as an editor and reporter.

Awards 
 Ćišinski Award, 1976
 Carl Blechen Award, 1983
 Literature award "Umwelt" by the federal state of North Rhine-Westphalia, 1992

External links 

1936 births
Living people
People from Bautzen (district)
Sorbian-language writers
Writers from Saxony
Leipzig University alumni